Troldkirken is a Stone Age long barrow near the village of Sønderholm, Denmark. 

It was constructed during the Funnelbeaker culture 5–6.000 years ago and is marked out by 47 megaliths. Placed on the top of the barrow is a polygonal chambered dolmen with a large capstone. The whole monument is some 50 metres long. 

The name Troldkirken means both Church of the Troll and Church of Sorcery in Danish. There are several tumuli and dolmens in the area.

The barrow has been a protected site since 1809, and was one of the first prehistoric relics to be protected by law in Denmark. Today The Historical Museum of Northern Jutland in Aalborg attends the barrow.

Myths
There are several myths surrounding Troldkirken and its peculiar name. One of them states that it appeared when nearby trolls was angered by the noisy church bells in Sønderholm Church. They grabbed some huge stones and threw them at the church, but missed. Another story says that a man once witnessed "the subterraneans" conduct a form of ceremony inside the dolmen.

Sources and references
 Svend Aa. Reerslev: Sønderholm – Landsbyen med de to kirker, Aalborg Amtstidendes Trykkeri, 1961 (2. oplag 1975). 
 Troldkirken Danish Agency for Culture

External links

 The Historical Museum of Northern Jutland 

Aalborg Municipality
Archaeological sites in Denmark
Megalithic monuments in Denmark
Funnelbeaker culture
Dolmens